The Minister of State for Exiting the European Union was a position in the Department for Exiting the European Union in the Government of the United Kingdom. The minister deputised for the Secretary of State for Exiting the European Union.

History 
David Jones was removed as minister after the 2017 general election.

List of ministers 

Colour key (for political parties):

References 

Brexit
Lists of government ministers of the United Kingdom
Defunct ministerial offices in the United Kingdom